Zeritis fontainei is a butterfly in the family Lycaenidae. It is found in the Democratic Republic of the Congo and Zambia.

References

Butterflies described in 1956
Aphnaeinae